The 2016 Havant Borough Council election took place on 5 May 2016 to elect members of Havant Borough Council in England. This was on the same day as other local elections.

After the election, the composition of the council was:

 Conservative: 31
 UKIP: 4
 Labour: 2
 Liberal Democrats: 1

Results 
The Conservatives, Labour, and UKIP were the only parties to win seats this election, with UKIP gaining two from Labour.

Ward results

Barncroft

Battins

Bedhampton

Bondfields

Cowplain

Emsworth

Hart Plain

Hayling East

Hayling West

Purbrook

St Faith's

Stakes

Warren Park

Waterloo

References

2016 English local elections
2016
2010s in Hampshire